Dmitry Sergeyevich Leonov (1899–1981) was a Soviet military leader, member of the Military Council of several fronts during World War II, reaching service rank of lieutenant general.

Career
1937, Political Commissar of 20th Rifle Corps

1937–1939, Member of the Military Council of Transbaikal Front

1939–1941, Member of the Military Council of Ural Military District

1941, Member of the Military Council of 22nd Army

October 17, 1941 – October 12, 1943, Member of the Military Council of Kalinin Front

October 12, 1943 – October 1944, Member of the Military Council of 1st Baltic Front

October 1944 – 1945, Deputy Member of the Military Council of General Staff

1945, Member of the Military Council of Far Eastern Front

1945, Member of the Military Council of 2nd Far Eastern Front

1945–, Member of the Military Council of Far Eastern Military District

–1950, Deputy Commander in Moscow Military District

1950–1953, Member of the Military Council of Leningrad Military District

1954–1959, Head of 3rd Directorate Counter-Intelligence, Committee of State Security (KGB)

1959, retired

Sources
http://www.generals.dk/general/Leonov/Dmitrii_Sergeevich/Soviet_Union.html

1899 births
1981 deaths
Soviet military personnel of World War II
Soviet lieutenant generals